Olivia Mellegård (born 17 June 1996) is a Swedish handball player for IK Sävehof and the Swedish national team.

References

External links

1996 births
Living people
Handball players from Gothenburg
Swedish female handball players
IK Sävehof players
Expatriate handball players
Swedish expatriate sportspeople in Denmark
Handball players at the 2014 Summer Youth Olympics
21st-century Swedish women